The Asbury Historic District is a  historic district encompassing the community of Asbury in Franklin Township of Warren County, New Jersey. It is bounded by County Route 632 (Asbury Anderson Road), County Route 643 (Old Main Street), Maple Avenue, Kitchen Road, and School Street and extends along the Musconetcong River into Bethlehem Township of Hunterdon County. It was listed on the National Register of Historic Places on March 19, 1993 for its significance in architecture, industry, religion, community development, politics/government, and commerce.  The district includes 141 contributing buildings, a contributing structure, two contributing sites, and four contributing objects.

Description
The Warne-Castner House is a two story brick building with Federal and Greek Revival influences. The rear wing is dated late 18th century, with the main block built from 1815 to 1818 and extended in 1846. Elisha S. Warne bought the property in 1815 and sold it to Reverend Jacob Castner in 1818.

The Asbury United Methodist Church is a one story brick building with a two and one-half story brick tower. It was built in 1914 with Victorian Gothic style. It is the third church constructed at this site. The first was founded by William McCullough and Bishop Francis Asbury in 1796. The second was built in 1842.

The Italianate style Brown/Wyckoff House was built  by Dr. Robert B. Brown. It was then owned by Martin Wyckoff. The Greek Revival style Richey/Bristol House was built  and bought by Catherine Richey. It was inherited by her daughter Anna Richey Bristol.

The former Presbyterian Church, built 1868–69, and the former elementary school, built 1919, both on School Street, are now residences. The church shows Italianate and Romanesque Revival styles.

Located along the Musconetcong River, the Hoffman Grist Mill was built  for James M. Hoffman. In 1895, Harry M. Riddle founded the Asbury Graphite Company and converted the mill to a commercial graphite mill. It remained in operation until 1970. The Asbury Graphite Laboratory, located in Bethlehem Township, was built .

Gallery

See also
 National Register of Historic Places listings in Warren County, New Jersey
 National Register of Historic Places listings in Hunterdon County, New Jersey

References

External links
 
 
 
 

Franklin Township, Warren County, New Jersey
Bethlehem Township, New Jersey
National Register of Historic Places in Warren County, New Jersey
National Register of Historic Places in Hunterdon County, New Jersey
Historic districts on the National Register of Historic Places in New Jersey
New Jersey Register of Historic Places
Georgian architecture in New Jersey
Federal architecture in New Jersey
Greek Revival architecture in New Jersey
Historic American Buildings Survey in New Jersey